Beouch Ngirchongor (born 1994) is a male Northern Mariana Islands sprinter. At the Micronesian Games he won the gold medal in the  400m in a new Northern Mariana Islands record of 52.74. He also won the 400 m hurdles. He competed in the 200 metres event at the 2015 World Championships in Athletics in Beijing, China.

See also
 Northern Mariana Islands at the 2015 World Championships in Athletics

References

1994 births
Date of birth missing (living people)
Living people
Place of birth missing (living people)
Northern Mariana Islands male sprinters
World Athletics Championships athletes for the Northern Mariana Islands